This is a summary of the electoral history of Nawaz Sharif, who was Prime Minister of Pakistan from 1990 to 1993 and again from 1997 to 1999 and then again from 2013 to 2017 and Leader of the Pakistan Muslim League (N) from 1993 to 1999 and again from 2011 to August 2017 and then again from October 2017 to February 2018. He was a member of the Provincial Assembly of the Punjab and National Assembly of Pakistan (MNA) for Lahore.

Pakistani general elections

1988 general election

1990 general election

1993 general election

1997 general election
Results as reported by news sources.

2013 general election

References

Nawaz Sharif
Sharif, Nawaz